Duke of Buckingham and Normanby is a title in the Peerage of England. The full title was Duke of the County of Buckingham and of Normanby but in practice only Duke of Buckingham and Normanby was used. The dukedom was created in 1703 for John Sheffield, 1st Marquess of Normanby KG, a notable Tory politician of the late Stuart period, who served under Queen Anne as Lord Privy Seal and Lord President of the Council. He had succeeded his father as 3rd Earl of Mulgrave in 1658 and been made Marquess of Normanby in 1694.

The duke's family descended from Sir Edmund Sheffield, second cousin of Henry VIII,  who in 1547 was raised to the Peerage of England as Baron Sheffield and in 1549 was murdered in the streets of Norwich during Kett's Rebellion. His grandson, the 3rd Baron, served as Lord Lieutenant of Yorkshire from 1603 to 1619 and was created Earl of Mulgrave in 1626, also in the Peerage of England. On the death of the 2nd Duke of Buckingham and Normanby in 1735, all these titles became extinct. The Sheffield family estates passed to the 2nd duke's half-brother Charles Herbert—the illegitimate son of the 1st Duke by Frances Stewart—who changed his surname to Sheffield as a condition of the 2nd duke's will, thereby becoming Charles Herbert Sheffield. Charles Herbert Sheffield was created a Baronet in 1755 and is the ancestor of the Sheffield Baronets, of Normanby.

The Mulgrave title was used again in 1767 when Constantine Phipps was made Baron Mulgrave. He was the son of William Phipps and Lady Catherine Annesley (daughter and heiress of James Annesley, 3rd Earl of Anglesey and his wife Lady Catherine Darnley, illegitimate daughter of King James II by his mistress Catherine Sedley, Countess of Dorchester). Lady Catherine Darnley later married John Sheffield, 1st Duke of Buckingham and Normanby, and hence Constantine Phipps, 1st Baron Mulgrave was the step-grandson of the 1st Duke of Buckingham and Normanby. In 1838 also the Normanby title was used again when the 1st Baron Mulgrave's grandson Constantine was made Marquess of Normanby. These titles are still extant.

Barons Sheffield (1547)
Edmund Sheffield, 1st Baron Sheffield (1521–1549)
John Sheffield, 2nd Baron Sheffield (c. 1538–1568)
Edmund Sheffield, 3rd Baron Sheffield (c. 1564–1646) (created Earl of Mulgrave in 1626)

Earls of Mulgrave (1626)
Edmund Sheffield, 1st Earl of Mulgrave (c. 1564–1646)
Edmund Sheffield, 2nd Earl of Mulgrave (1611–1658)
John Sheffield, 3rd Earl of Mulgrave (1647–1721) (created Marquess of Normanby in 1694 and Duke of Buckingham and Normanby in 1703)

Dukes of Buckingham and Normanby (1703)
John Sheffield, 1st Duke of Buckingham and Normanby (1648–1721)
John Sheffield, Marquess of Normanby (1710)
Robert Sheffield, Marquess of Normanby (1711–1714)
Edmund Sheffield, 2nd Duke of Buckingham and Normanby (1716–1735)

See also
Sheffield Baronets of Normanby
Baron Sheffield
Earl of Mulgrave
Marquess of Normanby
Duke of Buckingham

References

Kidd, Charles, Williamson, David (editors). Debrett's Peerage and Baronetage (1990 edition). New York: St Martin's Press, 1990.

www.thepeerage.com

Extinct dukedoms in the Peerage of England
Noble titles created in 1703
1703 establishments in England